Events in the year 1969 in Portugal.

Incumbents
President: Américo Tomás 
Prime Minister: Marcelo Caetano

Arts and entertainment
Portugal participated in the Eurovision Song Contest 1969, with Simone de Oliveira and the song "Desfolhada portuguesa".

Sport
In association football, for the first-tier league seasons, see 1968–69 Primeira Divisão and 1969–70 Primeira Divisão; for the Taça de Portugal seasons, see 1968–69 Taça de Portugal and 1969–70 Taça de Portugal. 
 22 June - Taça de Portugal Final

References

 
Portugal
Years of the 20th century in Portugal
Portugal